Salmanabad (also Romanized as Salmānābād; also known as Solţānābād, Solţānābād-e 'Āsjīl, and Kalāteh-ye Solţānābād) is a village in Golmakan Rural District, Golbajar District, Chenaran County, Razavi Khorasan Province, Iran. At the 2006 census, its population was 72, in 20 families.

References 

Populated places in Chenaran County